Arnold Mesches (August 11, 1923 – November 5, 2016) was an American visual artist.

Bio
Arnold Mesches was born in 1923 in the Bronx, New York and was raised in Buffalo, New York.  Mesches moved to Los Angeles in 1943 on a scholarship at the Art Center School.  In 1945, the FBI opened a file on him targeting him as a subversive communist. He was inspired to create works during the Republican Senator Joseph McCarthy era of the 1950s. He created many series of "provocative, layered collages composed from his personal FBI file plus news clippings, 1950s magazine cutouts, personal photographs, and hand written scripts."
Mesches has explored contemporary social and historical issues, informed by world history and his life during the Depression, which also reflect his art.

In 1970 he married, Jill Ciment, his seventeen-year-old student, who was thirty years his junior. Ciment went to become an accomplished novelist and memoirist. They remained happily married until his death.

In 1984, he moved to New York City and taught at New York University. He also taught at Parsons College and Rutgers University.  He eventually ended up teaching at University of Florida in Gainesville. He has had over 125 solo exhibitions and is represented in places such as the Metropolitan Museum of Arts, the Los Angeles County Museum of Art, the Brooklyn Museum, and the Museum of Modern Art in Sydney, Australia, among others. He died on November 5, 2016 in Gainesville, Florida at the age of 93.

Awards
National Endowment of the Arts, 1982
Pollock-Krasner award, 2002 and 2008
Art Critics of America, 2004
Florida State Individual Grant 2007

References

External links
Official Website
Arnold Mesches and Jill Ciment in conversation with the Brooklyn Rail

1923 births
2016 deaths
20th-century American painters
American male painters
21st-century American painters
21st-century American male artists
Artists from New York (state)
New York University faculty
Rutgers University faculty
University of Florida faculty
20th-century American male artists